Meriken Park is a waterfront park located in the port city of Kobe, Hyōgo Prefecture, Japan.  The park features the Kobe Port Tower, Kobe Maritime Museum, and a memorial to victims of the Great Hanshin earthquake.  The name of the park comes from the word "American," which was commonly translated as "Meriken" during the Meiji era.  Meriken Park is also the location of the Hotel Okura Kobe and Kobe Meriken Park Oriental Hotel.

See also
Port of Kobe
Kobe

References

External links
Japan-Guide - Meriken Park

Parks and gardens in Kobe
Buildings and structures in Kobe